Chapleau is a township in Sudbury District, Ontario, Canada. It is home to one of the world's largest wildlife preserves. Chapleau has a population of 1,942 according to the 2016 Canadian census.

The major industries within the town are the logging mill, Rayonier Advanced Materials (RYAM) (formerly, Tembec), and the Canadian Pacific Railway (CPR) rail yards.

History
The first European settlement in the area was established in 1777 by the Hudson's Bay Company.

In 1885 the Canadian Pacific Railway was built through the area. The CPR chose this as a divisional point, and the town was founded. It was named in honour of Sir Joseph-Adolphe Chapleau, a lawyer, journalist, businessman, politician, and most notably the 5th Premier of Quebec.

Louis Hémon, author of the French novel Maria Chapdelaine, was struck and killed by a train in Chapleau on 8 July 1913.

After a fire in 1948, the government was prompted to construct a road to Chapleau to enable logging contractors to truck timber before it rotted. The Chapleau Road (now Highway 129) was completed on January 28, 1949. In the early 1960s, Highway 101 was completed to link Chapleau with Timmins to the east, and Wawa to the west.

Chapleau also developed logging and lumber mill operations, up until 1994 the town supported no less than three lumber mills, but the United States' imposition of a softwood lumber tariff designed to benefit American lumber companies has led to many layoffs and difficult times for the town. At its largest, with large CPR and lumber operations, the town had a population of over 5,000. However, the town has been gradually shrinking since 1950.

In 1967, the Chapleau Centennial Museum was opened to showcase and celebrate local history. It is located at 94 Monk Street.

Geography and location
Chapleau is located in central Northeastern Ontario, in the heart of the Canadian Shield. Chapleau is geographically isolated; the nearest cities are Sault Ste. Marie, Timmins, and Sudbury, but all are more than a two-hour drive away. Highway 129 links the town with Highway 101, running east to Timmins and west to Wawa. Highway 129 also runs south, connecting with the Trans-Canada Highway, Highway 17 at Thessalon,  from Chapleau.

Via Rail's Sudbury–White River train also connects Chapleau station with White River, Sudbury and a number of remote communities.

Three First Nations reserves are located near the township: Chapleau Cree First Nation, Brunswick House First Nation, and Chapleau Ojibway First Nation.

One unusual feature of the community's transportation network is that because a railway yard separates the community into distinct halves, the main street in the western portion of the community loops back over itself in a manner resembling a cloverleaf interchange, and then crosses over both itself and the railway yard on a grade separation before returning to street level to link to the eastern street grid.

Chapleau Crown Game Preserve
Protected wildlife include moose, black bears, pygmy shrews, bald eagles and loons. The preserve is a source of tourism, drawing nature-enthusiasts and fishermen to the township. All forms of hunting and trapping have been forbidden in the preserve since the 1920s. The result is an area with abundant wildlife. In fact, over 2,500 moose and over 2,000 black bears reside within the game preserve. Logging does occur within the preserve, as does fishing. There are two provincial parks and cottages located within the preserve.

Climate

Chapleau experiences a humid continental climate (Dfb) with warm, rainy summers and long, cold, and snowy winters.

Politics 
Chapleau was incorporated as the Corporation of the Township of Chapleau on February 1, 1901. Since that time it has been governed locally by a five-member council. The current council is made up of Mayor Ryan Biggnuculo and Councillors Rick Smith, Gerard Bernier, Nicolle Schuurman and Lisi Bernier.

Demographics

Education
The town has two high schools, Chapleau Elementary and Secondary School (CESS) and École Secondaire Catholique Trillium, and two elementary schools, École élémentaire catholique Sacré-Cœur, and Our Lady of Fatima. Chapleau Elementary and Secondary school belongs to the Algoma District School Board, the others belong to the French and English Catholic school boards.

Economy
Main employers in Chapleau include the Canadian Pacific Railway and Ryam Lumber. Tourism is also an important part of the economy with several outfitters and lodges operating in the area.

In 2012, the Chapleau Economic Development Corporation (CEDC) was founded as an independent, non-profit organization. Resolution 28-371, passed by the Chapleau Town Council on September 24, 2012, established the existing agreement between the Township and the CEDC.

Goldcorp is working towards the advanced exploration phase at the Borden Gold project.

Borden Lake Mine opened September 23, 2019, creating many jobs for the local populace.

Wireless mesh Internet

Starting on November 9, 2005, Chapleau residents began testing a wireless mesh Internet technology in a program called Project Chapleau. This Wi-Fi connection covered the entire town and was the first of its kind in Canada.

This service was designed and implemented by Bell Canada Enterprises, Nortel Networks, and the Township of Chapleau.

An analysis of the impact of high-speed internet on the residents and town of Chapleau was published in 2010 by Jessica Collins and Barry Wellman.

In April, 2007, Project Chapleau concluded without a reason being given. The Project Chapleau office (The Chapleau Innovation Centre) was converted into a public internet access point, with job search and community networking facilities.

Media
All of the township's regular broadcast media are rebroadcasters of signals from Sudbury, Timmins or Wawa. The township's only purely local media service is CFJW-FM 93.7, a special station which airs information from the municipal government in the event of a weather or industrial emergency. The station does not broadcast on a regular basis; in the event of an emergency, the municipal fire service activates its fire sirens to alert residents to tune in the station.

Radio
 FM 89.9 – CBCU-FM, CBC Radio One
 FM 91.9 – CBON-FM-28, Ici Radio-Canada Première
 FM 93.7 – CFJW-FM, emergency alert
 FM 95.9 – CHAP-FM, community-owned rebroadcaster of CHYC-FM Sudbury
 FM 100.7 – CJWA-FM-1, adult contemporary

Television
Channel 9: CITO-TV-4 – CTV

Notable people
 Floyd Curry (1925–2006), NHL player and four-time Stanley Cup winner
 Robert Deluce, airline executive and current president and CEO of Porter Airlines
 Robert Fife, journalist and author
 Liz Howard, poet and winner of the Griffin Poetry Prize
 Adélard Lafrance (1912–1995), professional ice hockey player
 Rick Norlock, federal Member of Parliament
 Graham Ragsdale, decorated Canadian Army sniper
 Jason Ward, 1997 first-round draft pick of the Montreal Canadiens

See also
List of townships in Ontario
List of francophone communities in Ontario

References

Further reading

External links

Hudson's Bay Company trading posts
Municipalities in Sudbury District
Single-tier municipalities in Ontario
Township municipalities in Ontario